is a Japanese manga series written and illustrated by Sumito Ōwara. It has been serialized in Shogakukan's seinen manga magazine Monthly Big Comic Spirits since 2016 and has been collected in seven tankōbon volumes as of July 2022.

An anime television series adaptation produced by Science SARU aired from January to March 2020. A live-action television series was broadcast from April to May 2020. A live-action film adaptation premiered in September 2020.

Plot
First year high schooler Midori Asakusa loves anime so much, she insists that "concept is everything" in animation. While she spends her time doodling endless ideas and settings in her sketchbook, she has not taken the first step to creating anime, insisting that she cannot do it alone. After Asakusa's money-loving best friend Sayaka Kanamori notices her genius and drive, and when it becomes clear that their classmate and charismatic fashion model Tsubame Mizusaki wants to be an animator, the energetic trio start an animation club. Together, the three aim to realize the "ultimate world" that exists in their minds, and come to see the power that fiction and imagination have on their lives and the world around them.

Characters

Eizouken
The club is founded to produce the animation Asakusa and the others made. An anime cultural workshop already exists at Shibahama high school, but Kanamori lied and called the new club "A film club" and a teacher approved it. It was created because Mizusaki's parents forbade her from joining the anime club.

A freshman at Shibahama High who likes anime. She is curious and imaginative, but not good at socializing. Her policy is that "anime is all about the setting," and she has kept various designs inspired by her daily life in her sketchbook. Her classmate Sayaka Kanamori used to be the only person who knew about Midori's passion until she met Tsubame Mizusaki at Anime Club, which lead the three of them to start Eizouken. Her goal is to explore her own "greatest world."

Midori's tall and long-legged classmate. Though she has neither interest in nor knowledge of anime, she took interest in Midori and hangs out with her. She loves money-making activities and thinks of ways to make money even in casual conversations. Since starting up Eizouken, she has been the only realist, and is in charge of the producer role. She is also brilliant at negotiating with the school and the student council. While she appreciates Asakusa and Mizusaki's abilities, she is often troubled by the two creative-minded individuals.

Midori's classmate who is a charismatic amateur model and famous in the school. She is expected to be an actress in the future as both of her parents are actors, but she actually wants to be an animator, and is particularly skilled at drawing character movement. As Tsubame has been banned from joining Anime Club by her parents, she joins Eizouken instead and begins to create anime together with Midori and Sayaka. She grew up in a rich family, so her financial sense is much different from the other two girls.

Eizouken's advisor and consultant. He is known for the historical-figure-like mustache. He rarely gives direction to Eizouken and leaves the activities up to the members. He likes to play games in his free time.

Audio Club

The only member of Audio Club. She joined the club for the vast numbers of the audio files that are stored there, but ended up giving up a part of its storage to the student council. Approached by Eizouken, she accepted taking the role of the club's audio consultant on the condition that she can use part of their club room for storage.

The School Council

The school council president.

The school council's secretary. She is better at seeing the essence of things compared to the opportunistic president, and is considered an influential person on the council. She seems to care about Eizouken and often promotes their activities.

The school council leader.

The school council bill. Male student with a shaven head who seems largely gentle.

Robot Club

Media

Manga
Keep Your Hands Off Eizouken! is written and illustrated by Sumito Ōwara. The series started in Shogakukan's Monthly Big Comic Spirits on July 27, 2016. Shogakukan has compiled its chapters into individual tankōbon volumes. The first volume was published on January 12, 2017. As of July 12, 2022, seven tankōbon volumes have been published.

In March 2020, Dark Horse Comics announced the acquisition of the manga for English release which originally would have started on October 6, 2020, but was postponed to November 4, 2020.

Volume list

Anime
An anime television series adaptation was announced on May 7, 2019. Produced by Shogakukan, Warner Bros. Japan and Science SARU, the series was directed by Masaaki Yuasa, who also handled series composition. Yūichirō Kido wrote the scripts, Naoyuki Asano designed the characters, and Oorutaichi composed the music. The series aired from January 5 to March 22, 2020, on NHK General TV. The series ran for 12 episodes. Chelmico performed the series' opening theme song "Easy Breezy," while the band  performed the series' ending theme song . The popularity of the series led to it being rebroadcast on NHK Educational TV in Japan in October 2021.

It was streamed by Crunchyroll worldwide, excluding Asia. On May 18, 2021, it was announced Sentai Filmworks picked up the home video rights.

Episode list

Live-action film
A live-action film adaptation was announced on October 15, 2019. The film was directed by Tsutomu Hanabusa and stars members of the idol group Nogizaka46 Minami Umezawa, Asuka Saito, and Mizuki Yamashita as Sayaka Kanamori, Midori Asakusa, and Tsubame Mizusaki respectively. It was originally scheduled to release in Japan on May 15, 2020, but was postponed to September 25, 2020, due to the COVID-19 pandemic.

Live-action series
On February 17, 2020, it was announced that the film would be preceded by a six episode television mini-series, with the same staff and cast as the film. The series premiered on April 5, 2020, on MBS.

Reception

Manga
After the debut of the anime adaptation in January 2020, the manga had over 500,000 copies in circulation.

The manga series was nominated for the 11th Manga Taisho awards in 2018, and it won the top Bros. Comic Award in 2017. The series ranked #15 along with Dr. Stone on a list of the top manga of 2018 for male readers put together by Kono Manga ga Sugoi!. The School Library Journal listed the first volume of the series as one of the top 10 manga of 2021.

Anime
The anime series received widespread critical acclaim. During its airing in Japan, the series won one of the four monthly Galaxy Awards for March, becoming one of the candidates the association's yearly Galaxy Awards. 

Following the conclusion of the series, Keep Your Hands Off Eizouken! received extensive positive reviews as one of the best Japanese animated series of both the season and the year at large. Both The New York Times and The New Yorker highlighted the series as one of the best television shows of 2020, with The New York Times naming it to their "Best TV Shows of 2020" and "Best International Shows of 2020" lists, and The New Yorker identifying it as one of the Best TV Shows of 2020. Singer-songwriter Elvis Costello identified it as a personal favorite in a 2021 featured article in The Guardian. 

The series was awarded the Grand Prize for Television Animation at the 2021 Tokyo Anime Awards Festival, and won the animation division's Grand Prize of the 24th Japan Media Arts Festival.

The series received nominations in 10 categories in the 2021 Crunchyroll Anime Awards and won for Director of the Year and Best Animation.

At the 2021 Anime Awards Brazil, an event presented in cooperation with Brazilian entertainment website Omelete, the series received nominations in 9 categories and won 7, including Anime of the Year, Best Director, Best Screenwriter, and Best Animation.

Live action
The live action adaptation won Best Picture for Live-Action Visual Effects category in the 2020 CGWorld Awards. Studio Buckhorn, the studio that worked on the effects, also won the Grand Prize.

Awards and nominations

Notes

References

External links
  
  
  
  
 

2020 anime television series debuts
2020 Japanese television series debuts
Animation making in anime and manga
Anime series based on manga
Comedy anime and manga
Crunchyroll anime
Crunchyroll Anime Awards winners
Dark Horse Comics titles
Mainichi Broadcasting System original programming
Manga adapted into films
NHK original programming
Science Saru
Seinen manga
Sentai Filmworks
Shogakukan manga
Slice of life anime and manga
Japanese comedy films